is a passenger railway station in the city of Shiroi, Chiba Prefecture, Japan, operated by the third-sector railway operator Hokusō Railway.

Lines

Station layout
This station consists of a single ground-level island platform serving two tracks, with the station building built above.

Platforms

Adjacent stations

History
Nishi-Shiroi Station was opened on 9 March 1979. On 17 July 2010 a station numbering system was introduced to the Hokusō Line, with the station designated HS09.

Passenger statistics
In fiscal 2018, the station was used by an average of 12,864 passengers daily.

Surrounding area
On certain days, a retired Hokuso 7000 series car is put on static display in a siding near the station.
 Chiba New Town
Nishi-Shiori Eki-mae Post Office

See also
 List of railway stations in Japan

References

External links

  Hokusō Line station information 

Railway stations in Japan opened in 1979
Railway stations in Chiba Prefecture
Hokusō Line
Shiroi